Ihor Porozov (born 22 March 1991) is a Ukrainian long-distance runner. In 2019, he competed in the men's marathon at the 2019 World Athletics Championships held in Doha, Qatar. He finished in 50th place.

References

External links 
 

Living people
1991 births
Place of birth missing (living people)
Ukrainian male long-distance runners
Ukrainian male marathon runners
World Athletics Championships athletes for Ukraine